The slashed zero is a representation of the Arabic digit "0" (zero) with a slash through it. The slashed zero glyph is often used to distinguish the digit "zero" ("0") from the Latin script letter "O" anywhere that the distinction needs emphasis, particularly in encoding systems, scientific and engineering applications, computer programming (such as software development), and telecommunications. It thus helps to differentiate characters that would otherwise be homoglyphs. It was commonly used during the punch card era, when programs were typically written out by hand, to avoid ambiguity when the character was later typed on a card punch.

Usage

The slashed zero is used in a number of fields in order to avoid confusion with the letter 'O'. It is used by computer programmers, in recording amateur radio call signs and in military radio, as logs of such contacts tend to contain both letters and numerals.

The slashed zero was used on teleprinter circuits for weather applications. In this usage it was sometimes called communications zero.

The slashed zero can be used in stoichiometry to avoid confusion with the symbol for oxygen (capital O).

The slashed zero is also used in charting and documenting in the medical and healthcare fields to avoid confusion with the letter 'O'. It also denotes an absence of something (similar to the usage of an 'empty set' character), such as a sign or a symptom.

Slashed zeroes can also be used on cheques in order to prevent fraud, for example: Changing a 0 to an 8.

Slashed zeros are used on New Zealand number plates.

History
The slashed zero predates computers, and is known to have been used in the twelfth and thirteenth centuries.

In the days of the typewriter, there was no key for the slashed zero. Typists could generate it by first typing either an uppercase "O" or a zero and then backspace, followed by typing the slash key. The result would look very much like a slashed zero.

It is used in many Baudot teleprinter applications, specifically the keytop and typepallet that combines "P" and slashed zero. Additionally, the slashed zero is used in many ASCII graphic sets descended from the default typewheel on the Teletype Model 33.

The use of the slashed zero by many computer systems of the 1970s and 1980s inspired the 1980s space rock band Underground Zerø to use a heavy metal umlaut Scandinavian vowel ø in the band's name and as the band logo on all their album covers (see link below).

Along with the Westminster, MICR, and OCR-A fonts, the slashed zero became one of the things associated with hacker culture in the 1980s. Some cartoons depicted computer users talking in binary code with 1s and 0s using a slashed zero for the 0.

Slashed zeroes have been used in the Flash-based artwork of Young-Hae Chang Heavy Industries, notably in their 2003 work, Operation Nukorea. The reason for their use is unknown, but has been conjectured to be related to themes of 'negation, erasure, and absence'.

Similar symbols
The slashed zero has the disadvantage that it can be confused with several other symbols.

See the disambiguation page for the symbol Ø for a comprehensive listing: Ø (disambiguation).

Representation in Unicode and HTML
In Unicode, slashed zero is considered a typographic variation of the Arabic digit zero , which is code point . Since nearly all software requires each base-10 digit to have only a single, unique semantic representation, Unicode defines no code point (other than ) for altering the visual appearance of zero. This means that the slashed zero glyph is displayed for  only—and then always—when a font whose designer chose the option is active. Successful display on a particular local system depends on making sure that such a font is available there, either via the system's font files or via font embedding, and also ensuring it is selected.

As an explicit visual representation, Unicode supports slashed zero only indirectly, not as a single-character code point, but as two characters are paired in a combining sequence. see Combining solidus below.

Unicode 9.0 introduced another method to create a short diagonal stroked form by adding the Variation Selector 1  after the zero, on this browser it produces .

Typography

In most typographic designs, the slash of a slashed zero usually does not extend past the ellipse. Compare this to the Scandinavian vowel "Ø", the "empty set" symbol "∅" and the diameter symbol ⌀.

A convention common on early line printers left zero unornamented but added a tail or hook to the letter-O so that it resembled an inverted Q (like U+213A ℺) or cursive capital letter-O.

In the Fixedsys typeface, the numeral 0 has two internal barbs along the lines of the slash. This appears much like a white "S" within the black borders of the zero.

In the FE-Schrift typeface, used on German car license plates, the zero is rectangular and has an "insinuated" slash: a diagonal crack just beneath the top right curve.

Typefaces

Typefaces commonly found on personal computers that use the slashed zero include:

 Terminal in Microsoft's Windows line.
 Consolas in Microsoft's Windows Vista, Windows 7, Microsoft Office 2007 and Microsoft Visual Studio 2010
 Menlo in macOS
 Monaco in macOS
 SF Mono in macOS
 The Fedora Linux distribution ships with a tweaked variant of the Liberation typeface which adds a slash to the zero; this is not present on most other Linux distributions.
 ProFont
 Roboto Mono

Dotted zero typefaces:

 The DejaVu family of typefaces has a "DejaVu Sans Mono" variant with a dotted zero.
Andalé Mono has a dotted zero.
IBM Plex Mono uses a dotted zero.
Source Code Pro and its associated typefaces use a dotted zero.

Variations

Dotted zero

The zero with a dot in the center seems to have originated as an option on IBM 3270 display controllers. The dotted zero may appear similar to the Greek letter theta (particularly capital theta, Θ), but the two have different glyphs. In raster fonts, the theta usually has a horizontal line connecting, or nearly touching, the sides of an O; while the dotted zero simply has a dot in the middle. However, on a low-definition display, such a form can be confused with a numeral 8. In some fonts the IPA letter for a bilabial click (ʘ) looks similar to the dotted zero.

Alternatively, the dot can become a vertical trace, for example by adding a "combining short vertical line overlay" (U+20D3). It may be coded as 0&#x20D3; giving 0⃓.

Slashed letter 'O'

IBM (and a few other early mainframe makers) used a convention in which the letter O had a slash and the digit 0 did not. This is even more problematic for Danes, Faroese, and Norwegians because it means two of their letters—the O and slashed O (Ø)—are visually similar.

This was later flipped and most mainframe chain or band printers used the opposite convention (letter O printed as is, and digit zero printed with a slash Ø). This was the de facto standard from 1970s to 1990s. However current use of network laser printers that use PC style fonts caused the demise of the slashed zero in most companies – only a few configured laser printers to use Ø.

Combining solidus
Unicode supports combining characters, which overlay the preceding character to create a composite glyph. This can be used to obtain a crude typographic approximation where the slash is contained within the zero. It is treated literally as "a zero that is slashed", and it is coded as two characters: a standard zero  followed by either "combining short solidus overlay"  or "combining long solidus overlay" .

Reversed slash
Some Burroughs/Unisys equipment displays a zero with a reversed slash, similar to the no symbol,  ⃠.

See also
0 (number)
Symbols for zero
Names for the number 0 in English
Arabic numeral variations#Slashed zero
Regional handwriting variation#Arabic numerals

Footnotes

References

Further reading
; .

External links
.
Underground Zerø Album Cover Underground Zerø Band Logo

Typographical symbols
Numeral systems
0 (number)